Rossio is a station on the Green Line of the Lisbon Metro. The station is located between Figueira Square and Rossio Square from which it takes its name.

History
The original station was designed by the architect Falcão e Cunha with art installations by the painter Maria Keil.

Connections

Urban buses

Carris 
 12E Praça da Figueira - circulação
 15E Praça da Figueira ⇄ Algés
 25E Campo de Ourique ⇄ Praça da Figueira
 207 Cais do Sodré ⇄ Fetais (morning service)
 208 Cais do Sodré ⇄ Estação Oriente (Interface) (morning service)
 711 Terreiro do Paço ⇄ Alto da Damaia
 714 Praça da Figueira ⇄ Outurela
 732 Marquês de Pombal ⇄ Caselas
 736 Cais do Sodré ⇄ Odivelas (Bairro Dr. Lima Pimentel)
 737 Praça da Figueira ⇄ Castelo
 760 Gomes Freire ⇄ Cemitério da Ajuda

Aerobus 
 Linha 1 Aeroporto ⇄ Cais do Sodré

See also
 List of Lisbon metro stations

References

External links

Green Line (Lisbon Metro) stations
Railway stations opened in 1963